James Turner (6 October 1866 – 25 November 1903) was an English footballer, who played in the Football League for Bolton Wanderers, Derby County and Stoke. He also gained three caps for England.

Career
Turner was born in Stoke-upon-Trent but started his football career at Black Lane Rovers F.C. in 1887. The following year he moved to Bolton Wanderers where he spent six seasons making 103 appearances for the "Trotters" before joining his home town club Stoke in August 1894. In the 1894–95 season Stoke struggled and had to play a test match against Newton Heath to remain in the First Division, Stoke won the match 3–0 and stayed up. Turner established himself at left half for the 1895–96 season making 27 appearances. He joined Derby County in 1896 where he spent two seasons reaching the 1898 FA Cup Final losing out to Nottingham Forest before he re-joined Stoke in 1898. He played seven matches before retiring due to injury.

Career statistics

Club
Source:

International
Source:

Honours
Derby County
 FA Cup runner-up: 1897–98

References

External links

England profile

1866 births
1903 deaths
People from Goldenhill
Footballers from Stoke-on-Trent
English footballers
England international footballers
Stoke City F.C. players
Bolton Wanderers F.C. players
Derby County F.C. players
English Football League players
English Football League representative players
Association football wing halves
FA Cup Final players